"Believe" is the first single by Japanese rock band Luna Sea, released on February 24, 1993. It reached number 11 on the Oricon Singles Chart, and charted for seven weeks. In 2000, it was certified Gold by the RIAJ for sales over 200,000.

Overview
This single version of "Believe" is slightly different from the one on the album, Eden. Inoran is claustrophobic, this inspired him to compose the B-side "Claustrophobia". The title track was re-recorded for their 2000 compilation album Period -the Best Selection-. Luna Sea played "Believe" jointly with X Japan at the hide memorial summit on May 4, 2008.

Track listing
All songs written and composed by Luna Sea.

"Believe" - 4:17Originally composed by Sugizo. The song was originally called "AI", and is a rewritten version of "Conclusion".
"Claustrophobia" - 5:36Originally composed by Inoran.

References

1993 debut singles
Luna Sea songs
1993 songs